Thomas Strange may refer to:
Thomas Andrew Lumisden Strange (1756–1841), British judge in India and Canada
Thomas Bland Strange (1831–1925), British major-general
Thomas Hugo Strange, a fictional character ('Doc Strange')
Thomas Lumisden Strange (1808–1884), English judge and writer
Thomas Strange (MP for Cirencester) 
Thomas Strange (MP for Northamptonshire) (died 1436), MP for Northamptonshire
Thomas Lestrange (1518–1590) also called Thomas Strange, English civil and military administrator in Ireland